Paul McFadden (born September 24, 1961) is a former American football placekicker in the National Football League (NFL).  He gained recognition at the collegiate level as a kicker at Youngstown State University.  McFadden became widely known for his barefooted kicking style. 

He made his professional debut with the Philadelphia Eagles in 1984.  That season he led the NFL in field goals kicked (30) was named NFC Rookie of the Year and voted Co-MVP of the Eagles by his teammates.  He repeated as Co-MVP of the Eagles in 1985 and remained with the team until 1987.  He spent his final years in the NFL with the New York Giants (1988) and Atlanta Falcons (1989), respectively. His final NFL game was on 5 November 1989. 

After ending his career as a professional football player, McFadden returned to Youngstown, where he served as director of athletic development from 1993 to 2002 and Chief Development Officer from 2002 to 2011. In 2011, he was appointed as President of the Youngstown State University Foundation.  He currently resides in northeastern Ohio with his two sons.

He earned a BA in History from Youngstown State University in 1992, and a MA from Saint Mary's University of Minnesota in 2000.

References

1961 births
Living people
Players of American football from Cleveland
Players of American football from Youngstown, Ohio
American football placekickers
Youngstown State Penguins football players
Philadelphia Eagles players
New York Giants players
Atlanta Falcons players
Saint Mary's University of Minnesota alumni